KOHM is a class A radio station broadcasting out of Ridgecrest, California. It is licensed to Hispanic Target Media, Inc.

History
KOHM began broadcasting on 18 February 2015.

References

External links
 

Ridgecrest, California
2015 establishments in California
Radio stations established in 2015
OHM (FM)